The TeST TST-14 Bonus is a Czech high-wing, T-tailed, two-seats-in-tandem glider and motor glider, designed and produced by TeST Gliders.

Design and development
The TST-14 motor glider was designed for private owner and flying school use and as such features wing tip wheels that allow independent taxiing and take-off.

The TST-14 is constructed from composite materials, with the forward-swept wing a ribless composite sandwich structure. Each wing weighs  and has a single spar made with a carbon fibre composite flange plate and a polyurethane foam/fibreglass composite web plate. Glidepath control is by upper surface air brakes made from aluminium. The motor glider version is powered by a retractable  Rotax 503UL two-stroke powerlant. Extension and retraction of the engine is fully automatic, controlled with two cockpit-mounted buttons and actuated by two electric servo motors. The landing gear consists of dual fuselage-mounted tandem mainwheels and wing tip-mounted wheels.

The aircraft was type certified to the Joint Aviation Authorities JAR 22 standard for gliders on 10 Dec 2001. The TST-14 was not certified in the United States as the company explains, "due to the expense involved". The aircraft can be registered with the US Federal Aviation Administration as a Special Light Sport Aircraft glider or in the Experimental - racing/exhibition category.

Variants
TST-14 Bonus
Pure glider version, with a gross weight of 
TST-14M
Main production motor glider version, powered by a  Rotax 503UL two-stroke powerlant

Specifications (TST-14M)

See also

References

External links

Photo of TST-14 in flight
Photo of TST-14M showing engine installation

TST-14
Motor gliders
2000s Czech sailplanes
Light-sport aircraft
High-wing aircraft
T-tail aircraft